Cirrus  may refer to:

Science
Cirrus (biology), any of various thin, thread-like structures on the body of an animal
Cirrus (botany), a tendril
Infrared cirrus, in astronomy, filamentary structures seen in infrared light
Cirrus cloud, a type of cloud

Aviation
Cirrus aero engines, a series of British aircraft engines manufactured by various companies from the 1920s to the 1950s
Cirrus Aircraft, an aircraft manufacturer in Duluth, Minnesota, USA
Cirrus Airlines, a defunct regional airline in Hallbergmoos, Germany
Cirrus (rocket), a German research rocket first launched in 1961
Schempp-Hirth Cirrus, an Open-class sailplane
Schempp-Hirth Standard Cirrus, a Standard-class sailplane
Swing Cirrus, a German paraglider design

Music
Cirrus (album), a 1974 release by Bobby Hutcherson
Cirrus (band), an American electronica duo
"Cirrus" (song), a 2013 instrumental by DJ Bonobo
"Cirrus Minor" (song), a 1969 song by Pink Floyd

Other uses
Chrysler Cirrus, a car produced by DaimlerChrysler between 1995 and 2000
Cirrus (drug), a medication that contains pseudoephedrine and cetirizine
Cirrus (Helsinki building), a high-rise apartment building in Helsinki, Finland
Cirrus (Seattle building), a residential skyscraper in Seattle, Washington, USA
Cirrus (interbank network), an automated teller machine (ATM) network owned by MasterCard
Cirrus Logic, a semiconductor manufacturer
Access Database Engine, former versions of which were known as Microsoft Jet Database Engine and codenamed Cirrus
Cirrus Vodka, a vodka made in Richmond, Virginia, USA